Asaperda stenostola is a species of beetle in the family Cerambycidae. It was described by Kraatz in 1873.

References

Asaperda
Beetles described in 1873